Birdhaven is a suburb of Johannesburg, South Africa. It is adjacent to the suburb of Melrose. It is located in Region E of the City of Johannesburg Metropolitan Municipality.

History
The suburb is situated on parts of the old Witwatersrand farms called Syferfontein and Zandfontein. It would be proclaimed as suburb on 8 October 1949 and its name is derived from either the bird sanctuary next door or Jack Bird Barregar and the company Bird Investments.

References

Johannesburg Region E